The HTC EVO Design 4G (also known as the HTC Hero S on US Cellular and CSpire) is an Android powered smartphone released by Sprint Nextel on October 23, 2011 and by Boost Mobile on May 30, 2012. It is the fourth HTC phone in their EVO line. Notable features include a qHD display, an aluminum semi-monocoque form, world phone connectivity (multi-band), and a smaller overall size compared to most Android phones. The single-core processor and questionable battery life have left the phone with a mixed reception. The EVO Design 4G is also Sprint's last 4G phone utilizing its WiMAX  network.

On May 30, 2012, Boost Mobile released the EVO Design 4G as a pre-paid phone, shipping with Android 4.0 and Sense 3.6 pre-installed, an update that later became available for the Sprint version.

Hardware 
The HTC EVO Design 4G exterior consists of a glass screen with an aluminum bezel. The aluminum wraps around to the back of the phone, but only covers the middle portion of the back. This allows for plastic access panels to be placed at the top and bottom of the back, which also improve grip.

Software 
The phone initially came with Android 2.3.4 (Gingerbread) installed.  A future upgrade to Android 4.0 (Ice Cream Sandwich) was announced by HTC in March 2012. The phone received the upgrade to Android version 4.03 in July 2012.

The stock Android operating system was initially layered with HTC Sense version 3.0, which is software that visually changes the user experience. The benefit of this software has been met with mixed reviews. While some prefer the additional visual effects, opponents argue the cost of performance is not worth it. The upgrade to Android 4.03 also updated HTC Sense to version 3.6.

Availability 
The phone is available in the United States on the Sprint Nextel and Boost Mobile networks.

The HTC Hero S is available on US Cellular

References

External links 
 Tech Specs from htc.com

EVO Design 4G
Android (operating system) devices
Discontinued smartphones